WFPA (1400 AM, "NewsTalk 1400") is an American radio station licensed to serve Fort Payne, Alabama. The station is owned and operated by Southern Torch Media, Inc., located in Rainsville, Alabama. WFPA is presently silent, but is scheduled to return to the air sometime soon; when it last operated, it broadcast a news/talk format.

History

WFPA began broadcasting on January 8, 1950, as the first radio station in Fort Payne and DeKalb County. The owner was James Louis Killian. Killian sold WFPA to its general manager, George A. Gothberg, Jr., for $15,000 two years later; Gothberg, a resident of Cleveland, began operating the station 24 hours, unusual for that time in such a small market. In 1953, WFPA dropped its commercial programming for several hours in order to hold a fundraiser to buy the Fort Payne Fire Department a resuscitator. The station was a country music outlet known as "Radio Ranch"—it did not even air newscasts, unusual in that era.

The station suffered the first serious challenge to its existence only years after signing on the air. In 1954, the Federal Communications Commission advised Gothberg that the license renewal application would be designated for hearing. An examiner recommended denial of the station's renewal in 1955 because Gothberg had failed to disclose to the FCC that his father had provided some of the funds to buy WFPA. Gothberg appealed, and the commission found that the inconsistencies between his statements to the FCC and to a divorce court did not disqualify him, renewing his license. WFPA's religious director, the Rev. C. E. Dean, suffered a fatal heart attack on the air while hosting his program in 1959.

In 1962, Gothberg sold WFPA to clothing store owner Robert H. Johnson for $33,000. Two years later, Johnson was approved to increase WFPA's power from 250 to 1,000 watts. Johnson transferred the station in 1971 to WFPA, Inc., a corporation he owned; he would retain it until selling WFPA in 1979 to C. Albert Dick and his son James A. Dick of Chattanooga, Tennessee, for $360,000. Five years later, however, the Dicks went bankrupt and WFPA fell silent; as forgiveness for an unpaid note, Johnson, his wife Beatrice, and their daughter bought back the station. Robert Johnson died later that year, leaving the others to sell WFPA to the Fort Payne Broadcasting Company for $350,000 in 1985. In 1987, it was added to the Radio & Records adult contemporary reporting panel. The Watts family, owners of Fort Payne Broadcasting, sold the station to PEPA Communications in 1990 for $200,000; however, WFPA, now an oldies outlet, sold for just $34,650 four years later to KEA Radio.

In the late 1990s and early 2000s, WFPA changed its call letters twice, to WMXN in 1997 and WDLL in 1999 (after being sold to the Delgiorno Broadcasting Corporation), before returning to the original WFPA in 2002 in the wake of a $112,000 sale to DeKalb County Community Radio. WFPA has since been sold twice, to J.A.R. Services in 2006 and to the Wallace Broadcasting Corporation, its present ownership, in 2010.

On October 18, 2019, while WFPA was in the middle of its local morning show, it was served with an eviction notice by its landlord for failing to pay rent. Less than six hours later, the WFPA broadcast tower had been dismantled.
Then on November 12, 2020, a deal was reached for Michael Wallace to sell WFPA to a rising company out of Rainsvile, Alabama called Southern Torch Media Inc., which formed in Early 2019 by acquiring two radio stations from the nearby Scottsboro, Alabama area, WKEA-FM 98.3, and WMXN-FM 101.7 after starting off successful as only local newspaper The Southern Torch at first. The deal includes the rebuilding of the station to new high standard studios and offices paid for and arranged by Southern Torch, and funding to cover all costs and license renewals after relaunch of the station sometime in 2021.

Programming
WFPA primarily broadcasts syndicated Fox News conservative talk programming with national hosts, such as Jerry Doyle, Michael Savage, Gary Sullivan, Brian Kilmeade, and Rusty Humphries, as well as Alabama Crimson Tide sports.

References

External links
 WFPA official website

FPA
News and talk radio stations in the United States
Radio stations established in 1950
1950 establishments in Alabama